Brookesia brunoi is a species of chameleon. It is found in Madagascar.

References

Brookesia
Reptiles of Madagascar
Reptiles described in 2012
Taxa named by Frank Glaw
Taxa named by Aurélien Miralles
Taxa named by David James Harris
Taxa named by Miguel Vences